Mayo Clinic Florida is a comprehensive medical center belonging to the Mayo Clinic in Jacksonville, Florida. It is one of three Mayo campuses along with Phoenix/Scottsdale, Arizona and Rochester, Minnesota.

Mayo's campus is situated on 400 acres located near the intersection of San Pablo Road and J. Turner Butler Boulevard, an expressway which serves as a major thoroughfare to and from the Jacksonville Beaches.

History

Establishment and growth
Impressed by the medical treatment received by members of Jacksonville's Davis family (then owners of the Winn-Dixie supermarket chain) at the Mayo Clinic in Minnesota, they rallied community and corporate support to bring the Mayo Clinic to Jacksonville and donated the large tract of land off San Pablo Road on which Mayo opened an outpatient consultation center in 1986. This was the first time the Mayo Clinic established a location outside of Rochester, Minnesota. With an initial complement of 35 physicians and 145 support personnel, it grew to more than 7,800 total staff over the following 35 years.

Mayo Clinic Hospital
In 1987, Mayo Clinic purchased St. Luke's Hospital, Florida's oldest private hospital (which is also located off J. Turner Butler Boulevard, about 10 miles away from Mayo's San Pablo Road campus) to serve as the admitting hospital for Mayo's Jacksonville location. In 2001, after experiencing significant growth in Jacksonville, Mayo Clinic announced its intention to build a hospital on its San Pablo Road campus. The hospital opened in 2008 and created 304 beds and 22 operating rooms, offering care in more than 35 medical and surgical specialties. Mayo then sold St. Luke's hospital to St. Vincent's HealthCare, which renamed it St. Vincent's Medical Center Southside. Mayo Clinic Hospital is one of three teaching hospitals in Jacksonville, along with UF Health Jacksonville, located in North Jacksonville, and Wolfson Children's Hospital in downtown Jacksonville.

An expansion announced in 2022 will increase the total number of beds from 304 to 428 in 2026.

Services
A large variety of medical services a patient may need are available at Jacksonville's Mayo Clinic including doctor's visits, testing, surgery, organ transplants, emergency care and hospital care. Mayo also operates a primary care network with locations in Southside Jacksonville and Jacksonville Beach. In a 2008 examination of 5,453 United States hospitals, U.S. News & World Report ranked Mayo Clinic Jacksonville 23rd in adult specialization for rheumatology and 46th in adult specialization for gastrointestinal disorders.

In another U.S. News rating, the facility was rated as a Nationally Ranked Hospital in seven Adult Specialties, a Regionally Ranked Hospital – #1 in Florida and #1 in the Jacksonville metro area, and Rated High Performing in three Adult Specialties and nine Adult Procedures/Conditions.

Rankings

Facilities
The three main buildings at the site are the Davis Building, the Mayo Building (including the hospital) and the Cannaday Building. Laboratory research is also conducted on Mayo's campus.  Mayo's research is focused on cancer, neurological and neuro-degenerative diseases.  The goal of this research is to bring the advances from laboratory research to patient care as quickly as possible.

The campus also houses a Courtyard by Marriott. In addition, in September 2021 Mayo Clinic announced that a $70 million, 252-room Hilton Hotel will open on the Mayo Clinic Florida campus in 2024.

Expansion
This will allow for the growth of hundreds of staff positions and 100 physicians. The expansion will provide: space for cardiovascular, radiology and cardio-thoracic surgery program areas, expansion of the spine center and pain rehabilitation programs, additional surgical rooms, space and equipment to establish a molecular imaging center for radiology and laboratory expansion. Three additional buildings will be constructed; one will provide integrated services of complex cancers and have space for neurologic and neurosurgical care, one will be a lung restoration center to allow for more transplantations, and the third will include a positron emission tomography (PET) radiochemistry facility with an on-site cyclotron.

In 2019 Mayo announced it will spend $233 million to create a comprehensive cancer center in its Jacksonville campus. When it opens in 2025 it will be one of only two designated Comprehensive Cancer Centers in Florida. The center will also offer a particle therapy facility, one of three such facilities in Jacksonville (the others being proton therapy installations at UF Health and the Ackerman Cancer Center), and of which there are only a few dozen in the United States. Mayo's facility will be the first to employ carbon ion radiotherapy in North America.

In February 2022 Mayo announced a $432 million project to add five floors to the existing inpatient tower, plus additional facilities at the site. When completed in 2026, the expansion will add 124 beds to Mayo Clinic Hospital, bringing the total number of beds to 428.

See also
Mayo Clinic Arizona
Mayo Clinic Hospital (Rochester), Saint Marys Campus, Methodist Campus
Mayo Clinic College of Medicine and Science
Mayo Clinic Cancer Center

References

External links 
 Mayo Clinic Jacksonville website
 

Hospital buildings completed in 2008
Hospitals established in 2008
Hospitals in Florida
Mayo Clinic
Southside, Jacksonville
Teaching hospitals in Florida
Hospitals in Jacksonville, Florida